Craterocephalinae is a subfamily of silversides from the family, Atherinidae, the Old World silversides. The majority of the species in this subfamily are freshwater fish, although some occur in brackish water. They are found in Australia and New Guinea.

Genera
The subfamily contains the following genera:

 Craterocephalus McCulloch, 1912
 Sashatherina Ivantsoff & Allen, 2011

References

 
Fish subfamilies
Atherinidae